Shichikashuku Dam is a rock-fill dam in the town of Shichikashuku, Miyagi, Japan, completed in 1991. The dam crosses the Shiroishi River, a branch of the Abukuma River system.

References 

Dams in Miyagi Prefecture
Dams completed in 1991
1991 establishments in Japan
Shichikashuku, Miyagi
Hydroelectric power stations in Japan